Shawan is an unincorporated community in Stoddard County, in the U.S. state of Missouri.

A variant name was "Shawnan". The community was named after the Shawnee people.

References

Unincorporated communities in Stoddard County, Missouri
Unincorporated communities in Missouri